Consuelo Muro Urista (born 11 September 1963) is a Mexican politician affiliated with the Institutional Revolutionary Party. As of 2014 she served as Deputy of the LIX Legislature of the Mexican Congress as a plurinominal representative.

References

1963 births
Living people
Politicians from Michoacán
Women members of the Chamber of Deputies (Mexico)
Members of the Chamber of Deputies (Mexico)
Institutional Revolutionary Party politicians
21st-century Mexican politicians
21st-century Mexican women politicians
Universidad Michoacana de San Nicolás de Hidalgo alumni
Instituto Politécnico Nacional alumni
Deputies of the LIX Legislature of Mexico